The 1983 Stella Artois Championships was a men's tennis tournament played on grass courts at the Queen's Club in London, United Kingdom that was part of the 1983 Volvo Grand Prix. It was the 81st edition of the tournament and took place from 6 June until 13 June 1983. First-seeded Jimmy Connors won his second consecutive singles title at the event.

Finals

Singles

 Jimmy Connors defeated  John McEnroe 6–3, 6–3
 It was Connors' 3rd title of the year and the 112th of his career.

Doubles

 Brian Gottfried /  Paul McNamee defeated  Kevin Curren /  Steve Denton 6–4, 6–3
 It was Gottfried's 2nd title of the year and the 77th of his career. It was McNamee's 2nd title of the year and the 20th of his career.

See also
 Connors–McEnroe rivalry

References

External links
 Official website
 ATP tournament profile

 
Stella Artois Championships
Queen's Club Championships
Stella Artois Championships
Stella Artois Championships
Stella Artois Championships